Islam Shah Suri (reigned: 1545–1554) was the second ruler of the Suri dynasty which ruled the part of India in the mid-16th century. His original name was Jalal Khan and he was the second son of Sher Shah Suri. He was also known as Salim Shah Suri.

History
On his father's death, an emergency meeting of nobles chose Jalal Khan to be successor instead of his elder brother Adil Khan, since he had shown greater military ability. Jalal Khan was crowned on 26 May 1545 and took the title "Islam Shah". He was still worried that his brother would threaten his power and tried to have him captured. But Adil Khan evaded his grasp and raised an army. It marched on Islam Shah while he was at Agra. In the battle Islam Shah came out victorious and Adil Khan fled, never to be seen again.

The support some of the nobles had given his brother made Islam Shah suspicious and he ruthlessly purged their ranks, strictly subordinating the nobility to the crown. He continued his father's policies of efficient administration and increased centralisation. He had little opportunity for military campaigning; the fugitive Mughal emperor Humayun, whom his father had overthrown, made one abortive attempt to attack him. He did however lead one major campaign against Kalinjar. Due to his father's failure at his attempt to capture the fort, he laid siege to it and tried to capture it. After many days of fighting he finally managed to capture the fort and to avenge his father's death, he had the entire Rajput garrison inside the fort slaughtered. He built Salimgarh Fort.

Death
Islam Shah died on 22 November 1554. He was succeeded by his son Firuz Shah Suri, who was only twelve. Within a few days the boy ruler had been murdered by Sher Shah's nephew Muhammad Mubariz Khan, who then ascended the throne as Muhammad Adil Shah. The incomplete tomb of Islam Shah lies about a kilometer to the North-West of Sher Shah's tomb.

References

External links
 Islam Shah Sur, the forerunner of Akbar in reforms and policies

1554 deaths
Sur Empire
16th-century Indian Muslims
16th-century Indian monarchs
Indian people of Pashtun descent
1545 in India
Year of birth unknown